The see-see partridge (Ammoperdix griseogularis) is a gamebird in the pheasant family Phasianidae of the order Galliformes, gallinaceous birds.

This  partridge has its main native range from southeast Turkey through Syria and Iraq east to Iran and Pakistan. It is closely related and similar to its counterpart in Egypt and Arabia, the sand partridge, Ammoperdix heyi.

This 22–25 cm bird is a resident breeder in dry, open and often hilly country. It nests in a scantily lined ground scrape laying 8-16 eggs. The see-see partridge takes a wide variety of seeds and some insect food.

See-see partridge is a rotund bird, mainly sandy-brown with wavy white and brown flank stripes.  The male has a grey head with a black stripe through the eye and a white cheek patch. The neck sides are speckled with white. The head pattern is the best distinction from sand partridge.

The female is a very washed-out version of the male, and is more difficult to distinguish from its relative due to the weak head pattern.

Usually it is seen in pairs or, at the most, in flocks of two to four birds. But flocks of more than fifty birds have also been seen.

When disturbed, see-see partridge prefers to run rather than fly, but if necessary it flies a short distance on rounded wings. The song is a whistled hwit-hwit-hwit.

References

 Pheasants, Partridges and Grouse by Madge and McGowan, 

see-see partridge
Birds of Afghanistan
Birds of Pakistan
Birds of Central Asia
see-see partridge